KCSM is a radio station in San Mateo, California, broadcasting locally on 91.1 MHz.  The station broadcasts jazz music, 24 hours a day, commercial-free.  The radio station is not-for-profit, and listener-supported. The broadcast is mirrored as streaming media on the World Wide Web, extending the station's audience far beyond the Bay Area.  Owned by the San Mateo Community College District, the station serves the San Francisco Bay Area from studios and a transmitter both located on campus of the College of San Mateo.

History
KCSM radio and KCSM-TV were originally established by the College of San Mateo as training facilities for radio and TV broadcasters. Many well-known media personalities were educated at the College of San Mateo, including tabloid TV reporter Steve Wilson, ESPN sportscaster, San Francisco Giants announcer Jon Miller and K101 air personality Jeff Serr.

Between 1964 and 1980, the College of San Mateo offered a full range of courses in broadcasting and broadcast electronics, unusual for a community college; they were much more extensive than better known 4-year university programs. The television station and its companion radio station were staffed and operated by students. Some of the programs were obtained from independent producers, such as the show Radio à la Carte directed by Emmanuel Serriere.  This was discontinued in the 1980s, and today KCSM is operated by professional broadcasters.

KCSM began a "jazz kick" in 1986 playing straight ahead jazz during the week and weekends. KCSM also had specialty music programming such as bluegrass ("Bay Area Bluegrass Sunday"), classical, world and others.

In 1987, two local shows began, titled "Studio 170" and "New Frontiers". "Studio 170" was hosted and produced by Jay Peterson (JP) and "New Frontiers" was produced and hosted by Phil Adcock. Peterson and Adcock featured "New Age" and electronic music, styles which received minimal broadcasting on Bay Area radio at the time. Despite these two programs being broadcast early Saturday mornings, when most people were asleep, they had a huge local Bay Area following, providing radio exposure to many Windham Hill artists, as well as artists on smaller labels.

By the late-1980s and early-'90s, most of the music and talk programming gave way to jazz. With the exception of a few NPR programs such as All Things Considered and Morning Edition, the majority of programming was jazz and most of the air staff left in favor of jazz DJs.

In 1994, legendary station KJAZ was sold and the jazz format was discontinued. KCSM took over many of KJAZ's jazz CDs and vinyl recordings and added them to the library.

Sister station KCSM-TV was sold to the owners of KRCB in July 2018 and renamed KPJK; despite the sale, KCSM radio continues to be simulcast on KPJK subchannel 60.6 as "KCSM Jazz TV", even though the radio station was retained by the San Mateo County Community College District.

HD Radio
KCSM also broadcasts its main signal in HD Radio.

See also
 List of jazz radio stations in the United States

References

External links
KCSM Web Page

Richard Hadlock Annals of Jazz Collection (ARS.0065), Stanford Archive of Recorded Sound

San Mateo, California
Jazz radio stations in the United States
CSM-FM
NPR member stations
Radio stations established in 1964
CSM-FM